Karim Zaghib is an Algerian scientist known for his contributions to the field of energy storage and conversion. He is currently the Director of Energy Storage and Conversion at the National Research Council of Canada (NRC) and the founder of the Institute of Electrochemistry and Energy Systems (IEES).

Career 
After completing his Ph.D., Karim Zaghib joined Hydro-Québec, Canada's largest electricity producer, where he worked for over 25 years.

Research 
Zaghib is associated with over 550 patents and 60 licenses and has participated in over 420 articles and 22 monographs.

Zaghib's research has been widely cited, with an h-index of 83 as of 2023, according to Google Scholar.

Honors and awards 
Karim Zaghib has received the following:

 Kalev Pugi award winner
 Lionel-Boulet Award
 Hydro-Québec's Prix Innovation

See also 
 Prix Lionel-Boulet
 Lithium nickel manganese cobalt oxides

References 

Algerian scientists